Jimmy Morales (born 1969) was the 38th President of Guatemala.

Jimmy, Jim or Jaime Morales may also refer to:

 Jaime Morales Carazo (born 1936), former Vice President of Nicaragua
 Jim Morales, a character in Code Lyoko, see List of Code Lyoko characters#Jim Morales

See also
 Tnte. FAP Jaime Montreuil Morales Airport, an airport in Chimbote, Peru